Benamar Kachkouche (born 18 April 1951) is an Algerian former racewalker who competed in the 1984 Summer Olympics. He competed at the 1983 World Championships in Athletics and placed 45th in the 20 kilometres walk. He was Africa's first major continental champion in racewalking, taking gold medals at the inaugural races at the 1978 All-Africa Games and the 1979 African Championships in Athletics.

References

External links

1951 births
Living people
Algerian male racewalkers
Olympic athletes of Algeria
Athletes (track and field) at the 1984 Summer Olympics
World Athletics Championships athletes for Algeria
African Games gold medalists for Algeria
African Games medalists in athletics (track and field)
Athletes (track and field) at the 1978 All-Africa Games
21st-century Algerian people
20th-century Algerian people